Evans is an unincorporated community in Logan County, Illinois, United States.

References

Unincorporated communities in Logan County, Illinois
Unincorporated communities in Illinois